West Point is a city in Lee County, Iowa, United States. The population was 921 at the time of the 2020 census. It is part of the Fort Madison–Keokuk, IA-MO Micropolitan Statistical Area.

History
West Point was incorporated on March 25, 1858. The name of West Point was chosen by officers of the garrison at Fort Des Moines (Montrose).

Geography
West Point's latitude and longitude coordinates in decimal form are 40.717249, -91.451672.

Demographics

2010 census
As of the census of 2010, there were 966 people, 432 households, and 267 families living in the city. The racial makeup of the city was 99.1% White, 0.3% African American, 0.1% Asian, and 0.5% from two or more races. Hispanic or Latino of any race were 0.9% of the population.

There were 432 households, of which 26.2% had children under the age of 18 living with them, 51.6% were married couples living together, 6.3% had a female householder with no husband present, 3.9% had a male householder with no wife present, and 38.2% were non-families. 33.8% of all households were made up of individuals, and 15.7% had someone living alone who was 65 years of age or older. The average household size was 2.17 and the average family size was 2.71.

The median age in the city was 44.2 years. 20.7% of residents were under the age of 18; 6.8% were between the ages of 18 and 24; 23.6% were from 25 to 44; 26.3% were from 45 to 64; and 22.7% were 65 years of age or older. The gender makeup of the city was 47.2% male and 52.8% female.

2000 census
As of the census of 2000, there were 980 people, 426 households, and 264 families living in the city. The racial makeup of the city was 99.90% White, 0.10% from other races. Hispanic or Latino of any race were 0.51% of the population.

There were 426 households, out of which 26.3% had children under the age of 18 living with them, 53.8% were married couples living together, 6.6% had a female householder with no husband present, and 37.8% were non-families. 33.8% of all households were made up of individuals, and 18.8% had someone living alone who was 65 years of age or older. The average household size was 2.19 and the average family size was 2.83.

In the city, the population was spread out, with 20.6% under the age of 18, 5.9% from 18 to 24, 24.3% from 25 to 44, 25.2% from 45 to 64, and 24.0% who were 65 years of age or older. The median age was 44 years. For every 100 females, there were 84.6 males. For every 100 females age 18 and over, there were 85.7 males.

The median income for a household in the city was $38,409, and the median income for a family was $50,724. Males had a median income of $36,797 versus $22,750 for females. The per capita income for the city was $27,289. About 4.6% of families and 4.4% of the population were below the poverty line, including 2.9% of those under age 18 and 4.0% of those age 65 or over.

Education
Fort Madison Community School District serves the city; its high school is Fort Madison High School.

The Roman Catholic Holy Trinity Catholic Schools maintains an elementary campus in West Point; the secondary school is in Fort Madison, and there are early childhood campuses in Fort Madison and St. Paul. Previously the Marquette Catholic School System maintained its high school and administrative offices in West Point; in 2005 it merged into the Holy Trinity system.

Sweet Corn Festival
West Point is home to Iowa's Largest Sweet Corn Festival. The first festival was in August 1958. There are nearly 25,000 visitors during the four-day event and over 17 tons of sweet corn. The festival includes free sweet corn and stage entertainment, arts and crafts, bingo, 5K and 10K run, queen crowning, tractor pull, city parade, and teen dance.

Notable people
Gene Fraise, Iowa farmer and state legislator
Imogene King, a pioneer in nursing theory and practice

References

External links
 

City-Data Comprehensive Statistical Data and more about West Point
City of West Point, Iowa Website

Cities in Lee County, Iowa
Cities in Iowa
Fort Madison–Keokuk, IA-IL-MO Micropolitan Statistical Area